The Monessen Indians was the predominant name of  a minor league baseball team located in Monessen, Pennsylvania between 1934 and 1937. The Jays first played in the Middle Atlantic League from 1934 until 1937 in the Pennsylvania State Association. Known as the Indians in 1934 and 1936, the team was named the Monessen Reds in 1935 and the Monessen Red Wings in 1937.  The team was affiliated with the Cleveland Indians, the Cincinnati Reds and the St. Louis Cardinals throughout its history. 

The team won the league title in 1935.

Notable alumni
George Binks
Harry Craft
Ed Fernandes
Tommy Henrich
Jack Kraus
Joe Mack
Mike McCormick
Mike Palagyi
Tommy Reis
Al Rubeling
Charley Stanceu
Junior Thompson

References

Baseball teams established in 1934
Baseball teams disestablished in 1937
Defunct minor league baseball teams
Cincinnati Reds minor league affiliates
Cleveland Guardians minor league affiliates
St. Louis Cardinals minor league affiliates
1934 establishments in Pennsylvania
1937 disestablishments in Pennsylvania
Defunct baseball teams in Pennsylvania
Westmoreland County, Pennsylvania
Pennsylvania State Association teams